Zhuravlyovka is a rural locality (a selo) and the administrative center of Zhuravlyovskoye Rural Settlement, Belgorodsky District, Belgorod Oblast, Russia. The population was 1,193 as of 2010. There are 22 streets.

Geography 
Zhuravlyovka is located 29 km southwest of Maysky (the district's administrative centre) by road. Nekhoteyevka is the nearest rural locality.

References 

Rural localities in Belgorodsky District